"" ("Old Land of our Fathers") is one of the anthems of Cornwall. It is sung in the Cornish language, to the same tune as the Welsh national anthem, "Hen Wlad Fy Nhadau". The Breton anthem, "Bro Gozh ma Zadoù", also uses the same tune.

"The Song of the Western Men", more commonly known as "Trelawny", is often considered to be the Cornish anthem as well, and as in Scotland, opinion is divided on the matter, and there is no official position. The words to "Trelawny" are certainly more widely known amongst Cornish people.

Lyrics

See also

List of topics related to Cornwall
Cornish language
Culture of Cornwall
Gorseth Kernow

Notes

References

External links
Gorseth Kernow (archive link)

Cornish culture
British anthems
Cornish patriotic songs
Patriotic songs
Cornish folk songs
Cornish nationalism
Cornish language
Year of song unknown
Songwriter unknown